Støvring railway station is a railway station serving the railway town of Støvring in Himmerland south of Aalborg, Denmark.

The station is located on the Randers-Aalborg Line from Randers to Aalborg and is part of the Aalborg Commuter Rail service. The station opened in 1869, closed in 1974, and reopened in 2003. The train services are currently operated by the railway companies DSB and Nordjyske Jernbaner.

History 
The station opened in 1869 with the opening of the Randers-Aalborg railway line from Randers to Aalborg. The station closed in 1974 during a series of station closures in the 1970s, but the station reopened in 2003 as a part of the new Aalborg Commuter Rail service. In 2017, operation of the commuter rail services to Aalborg and Skørping were transferred from DSB to the local railway company Nordjyske Jernbaner.

Operations 
The train services are operated by the railway companies DSB and Nordjyske Jernbaner. The station offers direct InterCity services to Copenhagen and Aalborg, operated by DSB, and commuter train services to Skørping and Aalborg, operated by Nordjyske Jernbaner.

References

Bibliography

External links

 Banedanmark – government agency responsible for maintenance and traffic control of most of the Danish railway network
 DSB – largest Danish train operating company
 Nordjyske Jernbaner – Danish railway company operating in North Jutland Region
 Danske Jernbaner – website with information on railway history in Denmark
 Nordjyllands Jernbaner – website with information on railway history in North Jutland

Railway stations in the North Jutland Region
Railway stations closed in 1974
Railway stations opened in 2003
Railway stations in Denmark opened in the 21st century